Metro West Conference is a high school athletic conference in Minnesota. The name is based on the location of the schools in the western part of the Minneapolis-Saint Paul metro area. The conference began in fall 2014.  The conference was announced on March 5,  2013, by seven public schools (Bloomington Jefferson, Bloomington Kennedy, Chanhassen, Chaska, Richfield, Robbinsdale Cooper and St. Louis Park). In September 2013, the Minnesota State High School League assigned Benilde-St. Margaret's a private school, to the conference over the objections of the other schools. Richfield High School left in 2019. Kennedy left in 2022.

Member schools

Robbinsdale Cooper competes in the Northwest Suburban Conference for ice hockey in a co-op with Robbinsdale Armstrong.

Future members
On June 10, 2020 the conference voted to add New Prague, Orono, and Waconia starting in the fall of 2021.

References

External links
MetroWestConference.com

See also
 List of Minnesota State High School League Conferences

Minnesota high school sports conferences
High school sports conferences and leagues in the United States
Sports leagues established in 2013